Runella defluvii  is a Gram-negative and rod-shaped bacterium from the genus of Runella which has been isolated from activated sludge from a wastewater treatment plant in Pohang in Korea.

References

External links
Type strain of Runella defluvii at BacDive -  the Bacterial Diversity Metadatabase	

Cytophagia
Bacteria described in 2007